Triacsin C is an inhibitor of long fatty acyl CoA synthetase that has been isolated from Streptomyces aureofaciens. It blocks β-cell apoptosis, induced by fatty acids (lipoapoptosis) in a rat model of obesity. In addition, it blocks the de novo synthesis of triglycerides, diglycerides, and cholesterol esters, thus interfering with lipid metabolism.

In addition, triacsin C is a vasodilator.

Inhibition of lipid metabolism reduces/removes lipid droplets from HuH7 cells.  In hepatitis C infected HuH7 cells, this reduction/removal of lipid droplets significantly reduces virion formation and release.

General chemical description

Triacsin C belongs to a family of fungal metabolites all having an 11-carbon alkenyl chain with a common N-hydroxytriazene moiety at the terminus. Due to the N-hydroxytriazene group, triacsin C has acidic properties and may be considered a polyunsaturated fatty acid analog.

Triacsin C was discovered by Keizo Yoshida and other Japanese scientists in 1982 in a culture of the microbe Streptomyces aureofaciens. They identified it as a vasodilator.

See also
Fatty acid degradation#Activation_and_transport_into_mitochondria
Fatty acyl CoA synthetase

References

Ligase inhibitors
Nitrosamines
Hydrazones
Polyenes